

First round

Source: Welsh Football Data Archive

Chirk receive a bye to the next round.

First match was protested by Newtown WS regarding referee eligibility. Shrewsbury Engineers had won the first match 1-0.One goal for Wrexham was disputed

Second round

Source: Welsh Football Data Archive

Ruthin withdrew before replay.

Semi-final

Source: Welsh Football Data Archive

Final

References

 Welsh Football Data Archive

1880-81
1880–81 in Welsh football
1880–81 domestic association football cups